The 1979–80 NBA season was Indiana's fourth season in the NBA and 13th season as a franchise.

Offseason

Draft picks

Roster

Regular season

Season standings

z - clinched division title
y - clinched division title
x - clinched playoff spot

Record vs. opponents

Game log

Regular season

|- align="center" bgcolor="#ccffcc"
| 2
| October 13, 1979
| Atlanta
| W 115–101
|
|
|
| Market Square Arena
| 1–1
|- align="center" bgcolor="#ffcccc"
| 4
| October 17, 1979
| @ Houston
| L 112–116
|
|
|
| The Summit
| 2–2
|- align="center" bgcolor="#ffcccc"
| 5
| October 18, 1979
| @ Atlanta
| L 85–115
|
|
|
| The Omni
| 2–3
|- align="center" bgcolor="#ccffcc"
| 6
| October 20, 1979
| Boston
| W 131–128 (OT)
|
|
|
| Market Square Arena
| 3–3
|- align="center" bgcolor="#ffcccc"
| 8
| October 24, 1979
| @ Philadelphia
| L 110–132
|
|
|
| The Spectrum
| 3–5
|- align="center" bgcolor="#ccffcc"
| 11
| October 31, 1979
| Houston
| W 133–129 (OT)
|
|
|
| Market Square Arena
| 5–6

|- align="center" bgcolor="#ffcccc"
| 13
| November 3, 1979
| Philadelphia
| L 114–120 (2OT)
|
|
|
| Market Square Arena
| 5–8
|- align="center" bgcolor="#ffcccc"
| 18
| November 14, 1979
| @ Phoenix
| L 100–104
|
|
|
| Arizona Veterans Memorial Coliseum
| 8–10
|- align="center" bgcolor="#ffcccc"
| 20
| November 18, 1979
| @ Los Angeles
| L 104–127
|
|
|
| The Forum
| 8–12
|- align="center" bgcolor="#ffcccc"
| 22
| November 23, 1979
| @ Boston
| L 103–118
|
|
|
| Boston Garden
| 9–13
|- align="center" bgcolor="#ffcccc"
| 24
| November 26, 1979
| @ Philadelphia
| L 112–113
|
|
|
| The Spectrum
| 10–14
|- align="center" bgcolor="#ffcccc"
| 25
| November 28, 1979
| Milwaukee
| L 79–87
|
|
|
| Market Square Arena
| 10–15

|- align="center" bgcolor="#ffcccc"
| 27
| December 1, 1979
| Boston
| L 102–106 (OT)
|
|
|
| Market Square Arena
| 11–16
|- align="center" bgcolor="#ffcccc"
| 31
| December 12, 1979
| Seattle
| L 107–112
|
|
|
| Market Square Arena
| 14–27
|- align="center" bgcolor="#ccffcc"
| 35
| December 22, 1979
| Atlanta
| W 130–110
|
|
|
| Market Square Arena
| 16–19

|- align="center" bgcolor="#ffcccc"
| 39
| January 2, 1980
| Los Angeles
| L 120–127
|
|
|
| Market Square Arena
| 17–22
|- align="center" bgcolor="#ffcccc"
| 40
| January 3, 1980
| @ Milwaukee
| L 96–106
|
|
|
| MECCA Arena
| 17–23
|- align="center" bgcolor="#ffcccc"
| 43
| January 9, 1980
| @ Seattle
| L 111–120
|
|
|
| Kingdome
| 18–25
|- align="center" bgcolor="#ccffcc"
| 52
| January 29, 1980
| Houston
| W 133–112
|
|
|
| Market Square Arena
| 26–26

|- align="center" bgcolor="#ffcccc"
| 55
| February 5, 1980
| Philadelphia
| L 120–127
|
|
|
| Market Square Arena
| 26–29
|- align="center" bgcolor="#ffcccc"
| 57
| February 8, 1980
| @ Boston
| L 108–130
|
|
|
| Boston Garden
| 27–30
|- align="center" bgcolor="#ffcccc"
| 64
| February 24, 1980
| Phoenix
| L 105–113
|
|
|
| Market Square Arena
| 31–33
|- align="center" bgcolor="#ffcccc"
| 65
| February 26, 1980
| @ Houston
| L 88–93
|
|
|
| The Summit
| 31–34
|- align="center" bgcolor="#ffcccc"
| 66
| February 27, 1980
| @ Atlanta
| L 111–116
|
|
|
| The Omni
| 31–35

|- align="center" bgcolor="#ffcccc"
| 69
| March 5, 1980
| @ Philadelphia
| L 113–120
|
|
|
| The Spectrum
| 31–38
|- align="center" bgcolor="#ffcccc"
| 70
| March 7, 1980
| Atlanta
| L 94–99
|
|
|
| Market Square Arena
| 31–39
|- align="center" bgcolor="#ccffcc"
| 72
| March 11, 1980
| Boston
| W 114–108
|
|
|
| Market Square Arena
| 32–40
|- align="center" bgcolor="#ccffcc"
| 74
| March 14, 1980
| Philadelphia
| W 104–94
|
|
|
| Market Square Arena
| 34–40
|- align="center" bgcolor="#ffcccc"
| 75
| March 16, 1980
| @ Atlanta
| L 90–95
|
|
|
| The Omni
| 34–41
|- align="center" bgcolor="#ffcccc"
| 76
| March 18, 1980
| @ Boston
| L 102–114
|
|
|
| Hartford Civic Center
| 34–42
|- align="center" bgcolor="#ffcccc"
| 79
| March 22, 1980
| @ Houston
| L 110–125
|
|
|
| The Summit
| 35–44
|- align="center" bgcolor="#ffcccc"
| 82
| March 30, 1980
| Houston
| L 106–121
|
|
|
| Market Square Arena
| 37–45

Player statistics

Awards and records
 Don Buse, NBA All-Defensive First Team

Transactions

References

See also
 1979-80 NBA season

Indiana Pacers seasons
I
1979 in sports in Indiana
Indiana